New Taipei Municipal New Taipei Industrial High School  is an industrial high school in Tucheng District, New Taipei, Taiwan.

Brief Introduction  
New Taipei Industrial Vocational High School was established in 1970, including eleven departments—Machinery, Casting, Auto Mechanics, Mold, Mechanical Drafting, Electronic Engineering/Electronic, Data Processing, Special Education, Applied Foreign Language, Computer Science and Physical Education. Moreover, the subsidiary of Continuing Education School was offered for the purpose of fulfilling the credo on lifetime education. Also, Continuing Education Center was founded.

External links 
New Taipei Municipal New Taipei Industrial High School

1970 establishments in Taiwan
Educational institutions established in 1970
High schools in Taiwan
Schools in New Taipei